Eco-Cement is a brand-name for a type of cement which incorporates reactive magnesia (sometimes called caustic calcined magnesia or magnesium oxide, MgO), another hydraulic cement such as Portland cement, and optionally pozzolans and industrial by-products, to reduce the environmental impact relative to conventional cement. One problem with the commercialization of this cement, other than the conservatism of the building industry, is that the feedstock magnesite is rarely mined.

Energy requirements 
Ordinary Portland cement requires a kiln temperature of around 1450 °C. The reactive magnesia in Eco-Cement requires a lower kiln temperature of 750 °C, which lowers the energy requirements, and hence the use of fossil fuels and emission of carbon dioxide (CO2).

CO2 sequestration 
Eco-Cement sets and hardens by sequestering CO2 from the atmosphere and is recyclable. The rate of absorption of CO2 varies with the degree of porosity and the amount of MgO. Carbonation occurs quickly at first and more slowly towards completion. A typical Eco-Cement concrete block would be expected to fully carbonate within a year.

Waste utilization 
Eco-Cement is able to incorporate a greater number of industrial waste products as aggregate than Portland cement as it is less alkaline. This reduces the incidence of alkali-aggregate reactions which cause damage to hardened concrete. Eco-Cement also has the ability to be almost fully recycled back into cement, should a concrete structure become obsolete.

Environment friendly cement and concrete

Zero carbon emission cement 
To make truly zero CO2 and pollutants emission cement, MIT researchers have come up with a very innovative approach. The Figure shows the cement production process of this new approach. First of all, the new approach can replace the use of fossil fuels in the heating process with electricity from clean, renewable sources. At present, we have many ways to obtain clean electricity, such as solar cells, wind power, nuclear power and so on. Also, in many regions, renewable electricity is the cheapest energy source we have today, and its cost is still falling. In the new process, crushed limestone is dissolved in acid at one electrode and releases high-purity CO2, while Ca(OH)2 is precipitated as a solid at the other electrode. The sum of the electrochemical reaction occurring in this process is2CaCO3 + 4H2O -> 2Ca(OH)2 + 2H_2 + O_2 + 2CO_2

The Ca(OH)2 can then be processed in another step to produce cement. And then, we can easily capture the high purity CO2, O2 and H2 produced by this process. The high purity CO2 can be used to produce value-added product, and the O2 and H2 may be used to generate electric power via fuel cells or combustors. This approach can also significantly reduce the water consumption of cement production. In this approach, half of this water would be recovered upon the dehydration of Ca(OH)2. If H2 was used to fuel the kiln, the other half of the water could be condensed from the flue gas. In principle, all of the water used for electrolysis could be recycled.

Rechargeable Concrete Battery 
Concrete is the most used material. Concrete buildings can be seen everywhere around us. The research team of Professor Luping Tang from Chalmers University of Technology in Sweden is studying how to use concrete to store electricity. Essentially, they want to turning buildings into huge batteries. They have now successfully developed the first Rechargeable concrete battery concept.

They imitated the design of a simple but durable Edison battery. The Edison battery also called Nickel–iron battery, it is a rechargeable battery having nickel(III) oxide-hydroxide positive plates and iron negative plates, with an electrolyte of potassium hydroxide. The researchers added conductive carbon fiber into concrete to replace electrolyte. Also, the researchers identified the following metals are suitable for rechargeable concrete batteries. Fe and Zn can be used as anode materials. Both materials will be reduced during charging and oxidized during discharging. The half-cell reaction of the Fe and Zn are following: For Iron:Fe(OH)2  + 2e- -> Fe + 2OH- ; E^0= -0.89V. For Zinc: Zn(OH)4^2-  + 2e- -> Zn + 4OH- ; E^0= -1.2V

Nickel-based (Ni) oxides can be used as anode materials, The half-cell reaction of the Nickel-based (Ni) oxides is following:NiOOH  + H2O + e- -> Ni(OH)2 + OH- ; E^0= +0.52V

This device has been proven capable of charging and discharging. However, the current energy density of concrete batteries is significantly lower than the commercial batteries. Obviously, there are still many serious problems that need to be solved before the technology is commercialized, such as extending battery life and increasing the energy density of the concrete batteries.

Thermoelectric energy harvesting using cement-based composites 
The thermoelectric effect is a phenomenon in which the electrons (holes) in the heated object move from the high temperature area to the low temperature area by the temperature gradient. Equipment based on thermoelectric materials does not have any carbon dioxide emissions during operation. Thus, extensive use of thermoelectric-based cement structures is a reliable way to solve environmental problems. Thermoelectric-based cement structures can harvest energy from the temperature difference between the outdoor and indoor surfaces of the cement structure in the building.

Generally, cement exhibits slight electron movements because of the presence of n-type conductivity. Therefore, with the addition of p-type conductive admixtures, hole movements are present, which eventually develops electron–hole distribution in cement composites Thus, a voltage difference is attained and TEP is generated. The conductivity of the cement-based matrix can be enhanced even when admixtures are added below the percolation threshold. The admixtures currently reported that can be used to enhance the thermoelectric properties of cement composites include: (1) carbon fiber-reinforced concrete; (2) Steel fiber composites; (3) Metallic oxide composites.

References

Further reading

External links 
ABC New Inventors Segment (RealPlayer)
Discovery Channel (Canada) on Eco-Cement (Windows Media Player)
Independent appraisals of the technology
Alternative to low-carbon Eco-cement:  Making cement while sequestering carbon from the atmosphere, Issue 127, July 2008; Retrieved 2008-07-20.

Cement
Building materials
Low-energy building